Okome is an unincorporated community located in Lycoming County, Pennsylvania.

References

Unincorporated communities in Pennsylvania